Henry Herbert Shires (June 7, 1886 – April 29, 1961) was an American cleric who served as suffragan bishop of the Episcopal Diocese of California from 1950 to 1958.

Early Life and Education
Shires was born in Bernardsville, New Jersey on June 7, 1886 to Holman Hall Shires and Lucy Pateman Plumb. He studied at Cornell University and graduated in Mechanical Engineering in 1908. In 1911 he also graduated from the General Theological Seminary with a Bachelor of Divinity. He was also awarded a Doctor of Divinity in 1935 from the Pacific School of Religion, and a Doctor of Sacred Theology from the General Theological Seminary in 1941.

Ordained Ministry 
Shires was ordained deacon in June 1911 and was ordained as a priest in June 1912 by Bishop William Croswell Doane of Albany. On November 8, 1911, he married Mabel Clare Millis and had one son. He served at St John's Church in Bernardsville, New Jersey from 1911 until 1913 and then as rector of Christ Church in Jerome, Arizona between 1913 and 1915. In 1915 he became rector of St Luke's Church in Prescott, Arizona, and then in 1918 he transferred to Christ Church in Alameda, California. In 1935 he accepted the post of Dean of the Church Divinity School of the Pacific, where he remained until 1950.

Bishop 
On April 19, 1950, Shires was elected suffragan bishop of California during a diocesan convention. He was consecrated on September 29, 1950 in Grace Cathedral by Presiding Bishop Henry Knox Sherrill. He retired in 1958 but served as an archdeacon until a successor was elected and consecrated in 1960. He died on April 29, 1961 at his home of a heart attack.  His son, Henry Millis Shires, became an Episcopal priest and was professor of New Testament at the Episcopal Theological Seminary in Cambridge, Massachusetts.

References

1886 births
1961 deaths
20th-century American Episcopalians
Episcopal bishops of California
Church Divinity School of the Pacific alumni
Cornell University College of Engineering alumni